Archimantis armata is a species of praying mantis in the family Mantidae.

See also
List of mantis genera and species

References

Armata
Insects described in 1877